The H. L. Mencken House was the home of  Baltimore Sun journalist and author Henry Louis Mencken, who lived here from 1883 until his death in 1956.  The Italianate brick row house at 1524 Hollins Street in Baltimore was designated a National Historic Landmark in 1985. Mencken wrote of his home: "I have lived in one house in Baltimore for nearly 45 years. It has changed in that time, as I have—but somehow it still remains the same.... It is as much a part of me as my two hands. If I had to leave it I'd be as certainly crippled as if I lost a leg."

After his death on January 26, 1956, his home was bequeathed to the University of Maryland. In 1983 the City of Baltimore acquired the H. L. Mencken House from the University, in exchange for the Old Pine Street Station. With period furniture, his restored second-floor office, and backyard gazebo, the H. L. Mencken House opened as part of the City Life Museums and a center for theatrical, literary and musical events. Although the City Life Museums closed in 1997, the landmark still displays a special commemorative plaque about its famous occupant. The organization "Friends of the H. L. Mencken House" led efforts of several groups to redirect and expand the use of it.  A $3 million donation from retired naval commander Max Hency in 2018 allowed the organization to begin renovating the house, and it opened to the public in 2019, though only by prior reservation.

It was declared a National Historic Landmark in 1983.

Description
The Mencken House is a three-story brick row house in Baltimore's Union Square neighborhood. The property extends between Hollins Street at the front to Booth Street to the rear. The house fronts on Union Square. It is one of several nearly identical houses on the north side of the park, sharing Italianate detailing with its neighbors. The house and its interiors have remained faithful to its period of historical significance, from 1883 to 1956. The three-story section stands at the front, while an extension to the rear telescopes to two stories, then one story. In standard Baltimore rowhouse style, the house has a marble foundation and entrance steps.

The entry features double doors leading to a vestibule with marble flooring and tiled walls. A further set of glazed double doors leads to the stair hall on the side of the house. A front parlor is located to one side of the hall, followed by the back parlor, connected by pocket doors. A further room was a dining room in the Mencken years, but was probably originally the kitchen. It is followed by the existing kitchen, built in 1923. On the second floor, the front room was Mencken's study.

See also
List of National Historic Landmarks in Maryland
National Register of Historic Places listings in Central Baltimore

References

External links
, including photo in 1982, at Maryland Historical Trust
H.L. Mencken House, National Park Service, Baltimore: A National Register of Historic Places Travel Itinerary
"Writings of H.L. Mencken", broadcast from the H. L. Mencken House from C-SPAN's American Writers
H.L. Mencken House - Explore Baltimore Heritage

House
Houses completed in 1883
Historic district contributing properties in Maryland
Houses on the National Register of Historic Places in Baltimore
Individually listed contributing properties to historic districts on the National Register in Maryland
National Historic Landmarks in Maryland
Union Square, Baltimore
Baltimore City Landmarks